List of newspapers in Georgia may refer to:
 List of newspapers in Georgia (country)
 List of newspapers in Georgia (U.S. state)